Stony Brook is a tributary of the Merrimack River in northeastern Massachusetts, joining the Merrimack at Chelmsford.

Its watershed includes the towns of Boxborough, Harvard, Littleton, Ayer, Groton, Westford, Tyngsborough, and Chelmsford.

Beaver Brook passes through Mill Pond in the center of Littleton and ends at Forge Pond at Forge Village in Westford.

Stony Brook originates as the dammed outlet of Forge Pond and continues northeast past Graniteville, the Stony Brook Reservoir (not to be confused with the Stony Brook Reservoir in Weston and Waltham), Westford Station, Nabnasset, Brookside Station, and West Chelmsford, reaching the Merrimack at North Chelmsford.

Stony Brook is parallel through its course by the Stony Brook Railroad.

References

Rivers of Middlesex County, Massachusetts